Ismoili Somoni (formerly: Kalininabad) is a village and jamoat in north-west Tajikistan. It is located in Devashtich District in Sughd Region. The jamoat has a total population of 13,970 (2015).

References

Populated places in Sughd Region
Jamoats of Tajikistan